The Chris Mannix Show was a weekly sports radio program that is hosted by Chris Mannix. The program is broadcast on NBC Sports Radio on Sundays from 6p to 9p ET. It premiered on Sunday, January 6, 2013.  It ended on February 2, 2018.  The Afternoon Drive slot on NBC Sports Radio was replaced by Calling The Shots with Keith Irizarry.

References

NBC Sports Radio programming
American sports radio programs